Gilbert Talbot may refer to:

Sir Gilbert Talbot (soldier) (1452–1518), Tudor Knight of the Garter
Sir Gilbert Talbot (knight) (b. by 1479–1542) Member of Parliament for Worcestershire 1529–1539 and 1542
Sir Gilbert Talbot (courtier) (c. 1606–1695), Stuart courtier and Master of the Jewel Office, MP for Plymouth
Gilbert Talbot, 1st Baron Talbot (1276–1346)
Gilbert Talbot, 3rd Baron Talbot (c. 1332–1387)
Gilbert Talbot, 5th Baron Talbot (c. 1383–1419)
Gilbert Talbot, 7th Earl of Shrewsbury (1552–1616)
Gilbert Talbot, 13th Earl of Shrewsbury (1673–1743), Earl of Shrewsbury
Gilbert Talbot (c. 1895–1915), World War I soldier after whom Christian movement Toc H (Talbot House), Poperinge, Belgium was named